Ariadna Cabrol (born August 23, 1982) is a Spanish actress and model.

Personal life
Ariadna was born in Matadepera in Barcelona on 23 August 1982. She has attended the Nancy Tuñón drama school, completed a course at the Belarusian State University of Culture and Arts and worked with prominent personalities such as Estel Rovira and Raquel Carballo, in the field of acting.

Career
Ariadna made her debut in 2000 with the short film Foc al càntir.  She  then went on to star in a few Spanish TV shows like Los Serrano, Un Paso Adelante and TV movies like  La stella dei re, Estocolm.

Her first break came with Perfume: The Story of a Murderer where she played a beggar woman, the perfumers first victim. She has done a few other films like the Serbian horror film Zone of the Dead.

Aside from films, she has also done some Spanish language theatre productions. She is also a producer and dancer, trained in Flamenco.

Filmography
 Foc al càntir (2000)
 Youth (2004) .... Roser
 Perfume: The Story of a Murderer (2006) .... Beggar Woman 1
 Les pel·lícules del meu pare (2007) .... Amiga Filmoteca
 Fermat's Room (2007) .... Girl
 Shiver (2008)  .... Raquel
 Zone of the Dead (2009) .... Angela
 Dos billetes (2009) .... Mónica
 Eloïse's Lover (2009) .... Eloïse
 Un golpe de suerte (2011) .... Tamara
  Zindagi Na Milegi Dobara  (Bollywood Film) (2011) .... Nuria
 Mil cretins (2011) .... La noia preciosa
 Insensibles (2012) ... María
 The Innocent (2021) ... Eva

References

External links
 Official Blog of Ariadna Cabrol

Spanish actresses
People from Barcelona
1982 births
Living people